The Ambrosini Rondone is an Italian-designed two/three-seat light touring monoplane of the early 1950s.

Development

The Rondone was created to satisfy the demand for a more contemporary touring aircraft from Italian private pilots and aero clubs. Stelio Frati prepared the basic design for the prototype two-seat F.4 Rondone I which was built by CVV in 1951. This was followed by nine production examples produced by SAI Ambrosini in collaboration with Aeronautica Lombardi.

The three-seat F.7 Rondone II first flew on 10 February 1954 and the prototype and nine production examples were built for Ambrosini by Legnami Pasotti.

The Rondone is of conventional wooden construction with a plywood-covered one-piece single spar wing and a monocoque fuselage. The tricycle undercarriage is retractable. Two-position flaps and dual controls are fitted. The Rondone II has an extended cabin with additional rear side windows.

Operational history

The Rondone was initially mainly sold to individuals and clubs in Italy, but examples later served in France and Germany. Several were still operational in 2009, including the German aircraft.

Variants
F.4 Rondone I prototype 
Two-seater with a  Walter Mikron III. 1 built.
F.4 Rondone I production aircraft
Two-seater with an  Continental C-85 or  Continental C-90. 10 built.
F.7 Rondone II
Three-seater with a  Continental C90 or  Lycoming O-290-D2 engine. 10 built from new plus one converted from a F.4. Some were later fitted with a  Continental O-200 engine.

Specifications (F.7 Rondone II with Lycoming engine)

References

Bibliography

1950s Italian civil utility aircraft
Low-wing aircraft
Single-engined tractor aircraft
Aircraft first flown in 1951